Thomas Benedict Cotter (September 30, 1866 – November 22, 1906) was a Major League Baseball catcher who played for one season. He played for the Boston Reds in six games in 1891, helping lead the Reds to the American Association title.

External links

19th-century baseball players
Major League Baseball catchers
Baseball players from Massachusetts
Boston Reds (AA) players
1866 births
1906 deaths
Sportspeople from Waltham, Massachusetts
Brockton Shoemakers players